The 2001 LSU Tigers football team represented Louisiana State University in the 2001 NCAA Division I-A football season.  Coached by Nick Saban, the Tigers played their home games at Tiger Stadium in Baton Rouge, Louisiana.  LSU went 10–3 and won the SEC West and represented the division in the 2001 SEC Championship Game for the first time. After a 31–20 upset of favored Tennessee, LSU played in the 2002 Sugar Bowl in New Orleans, Louisiana, and defeated yet another higher ranked opponent, Illinois, 47–34.

Schedule

Roster and Coaches

LSU Tigers in the 2002 National Football League Draft

https://www.pro-football-reference.com/draft/2002.htm

References

LSU
LSU Tigers football seasons
Southeastern Conference football champion seasons
Sugar Bowl champion seasons
LSU Tigers football